This is a list of the principal government ministers during the reign of Elizabeth I of England, 1558 to 1603. From the outset of her reign, her chief minister was Sir William Cecil, later Lord Burghley. He died in 1598 and was succeeded by his son Sir Robert Cecil.

Other important ministers were Sir Francis Knollys and James Windebank.

Sources

 Haydn's Book of Dignities, 1894

English ministries
Elizabeth I
16th-century English politicians
Court of Elizabeth I